Robert Edward Green (January 1912 – 1949) was an English footballer. His regular position was as a forward. He was born in Tewkesbury, Gloucestershire. He started his playing career at Gloucestershire amateur team Tewkesbury Town before playing for Bournemouth & Boscombe Athletic, Derby County, Manchester United, Stockport County and Cheltenham Town.

External links
MUFCInfo.com profile

1912 births
English footballers
AFC Bournemouth players
Derby County F.C. players
Manchester United F.C. players
Stockport County F.C. players
Cheltenham Town F.C. players
1949 deaths
Association football forwards